Chengjiang may refer to the following locations in the People's Republic of China:

 Chengjiang County (澂江县), Yuxi, Yunnan
 Chengjiang Subdistrict, Xuancheng (澄江街道), in Xuanzhou District, Xuanzhou, Anhui
 Chengjiang Subdistrict, Taizhou, Zhejiang (澄江街道), in Huangyan District, Taizhou, Zhejiang